Nicholas Chad Cowburn (born 7 March 1995) is an Australian professional footballer who plays as a Midfielder (association football) for Lake Macquarie City FC.

Football career
Cowburn first started his youth career at Toronto Awaba Stags before joining the Newcastle jets in 2011. Cowburn has made 47 first team appearances for The Jets since 2014. In January 2016, Cowburn, penned a two-season contract with The Jets.

Personal life
Nick's father, Brett Cowburn, played in the NSL for Newcastle KB United, and his brother also appeared in the NSL for Newcastle Jets in the 2003–04 season.

References

External links

1995 births
Living people
Association football defenders
Australian soccer players
Australia youth international soccer players
Australia under-20 international soccer players
Newcastle Jets FC players
A-League Men players
National Premier Leagues players